John Friar (18 July 1911 – 22 May 1979) was a Scottish footballer who played on the right-wing. He represented Carluke Rovers, Bradford City, Hibernian, Portsmouth, Bournemouth & Boscombe Athletic, Port Vale, Preston North End, Norwich City, and Ipswich Town.

Career
Friar played for Carluke Rovers and Bradford City, before joining Hibernian. He made his debut on 8 August 1931, in a 1–0 win over Alloa Athletic at Easter Road, and scored his first goal for "Hibs" ten days later in a 3–1 win over Arbroath. He scored a total of 11 goals in 25 Second Division appearances in the 1931–32 season. He moved back to England in April 1932 when he signed with Portsmouth. In 1933, he and Jack Surtees were traded to Bournemouth & Boscombe Athletic, with Len Williams moving in the opposite direction. He joined Port Vale in July 1934 and scored on his debut on 25 August; a 2–0 win over Sheffield United at The Old Recreation Ground. He went on to score braces in home wins over Southampton, Manchester United and Bury, and boasted a total of ten goals in the opening 18 Second Division games of the season. This record led him to be snapped up by First Division side Preston North End in December 1934, in exchange for Ted Critchley and a cash balance. He later played for Norwich City and Ipswich Town.

Career statistics
Source:

References

Footballers from North Lanarkshire
Scottish footballers
Association football wingers
Carluke Rovers F.C. players
Bradford City A.F.C. players
Hibernian F.C. players
Portsmouth F.C. players
AFC Bournemouth players
Port Vale F.C. players
Preston North End F.C. players
Norwich City F.C. players
Ipswich Town F.C. players
Scottish Football League players
English Football League players
1911 births
1979 deaths
People from Cambusnethan
Sportspeople from Wishaw